Rt. Hon. Ehie Ogerenye Edison MHA is a Nigerian politician and the current Deputy Speaker of the Rivers State House of Assembly. He was elected into the Rivers State House of Assembly in 2015, and re-elected in the rerun election in 2016 and in 2019 and represents the constituency of Ahoada East II under the platform of the Rivers State Peoples Democratic Party.

Early life and education 
Hon. Ehie Edison was born in Port Harcourt, Rivers State to the family of Late Chief Clinton Dollars Ehie and Mrs. Salome Ehie all from the Ekpeye ethnic nationality in Rivers State.

Edison attended (UPE) Primary School and following on he attended Western Ahoada County High School, Ahoada Town. He is a graduate of Law from the Rivers State University, Formerly Rivers State University of Science and Technology and holds a Post Graduate Diploma in Public Administration, a Master in Petroleum Law. Edison Ehie has worked as a Community Liaison Officer in ZB Joint Ventures and Ferzinat Oil and Gas Company Limited.

He was also a National President of the National Union of Rivers State Student (NURSS) and the National President of the Orashi Youth Council. He has also served as Youth Leader of the Peoples Democratic Party in Ahoada East Local Government Area of Rivers State. Rt. Hon. Ehie Edison is also a business man, farmer and devoted Christian.

Career

One Million Youth March For Gov. Wike

References
2. https://elanhub.net/ehie-edison-donates-n5m-to-the-less-privileged-in-ahoada-east-lga/ju

Living people
Members of the Rivers State House of Assembly
People from Port Harcourt
Rivers State University alumni
Year of birth missing (living people)